Reana del Rojale is a comune (municipality) in the Province of Udine in the Italian region Friuli-Venezia Giulia, located about  northwest of Trieste and about  north of Udine.

Twin towns
Reana del Rojale is twinned with:

  Križevci, Croatia
  Salagnon, France

References

External links
 Official website

Cities and towns in Friuli-Venezia Giulia